Pollard is a town in Escambia County, Alabama, United States. It was the first established county seat of Escambia County, from its creation in 1868 until 1883, when it lost that distinction to Brewton. At the 2020 census, the population was 128.

Geography
Pollard is located in south-central Escambia County at  (31.027340, -87.172342).

Demographics

As of the census of 2000, there were 120 people, 48 households, and 33 families residing in the town. The racial makeup of the town was 51.67% White, 41.67% Black or African American, 1.67% Native American, 0.83% from other races, and 4.17% from two or more races. 1.67% of the population were Hispanic or Latino of any race.

There were 48 households, out of which 31.3% had children under the age of 18 living with them, 50.0% were married couples living together, 14.6% had a female householder with no husband present, and 29.2% were non-families. 29.2% of all households were made up of individuals, and 12.5% had someone living alone who was 65 years of age or older. The average household size was 2.50 and the average family size was 3.09.

In the town, the population was spread out, with 27.5% under the age of 18, 6.7% from 18 to 24, 22.5% from 25 to 44, 23.3% from 45 to 64, and 20.0% who were 65 years of age or older. The median age was 41 years. For every 100 females, there were 106.9 males. For every 100 females age 18 and over, there were 93.3 males.

The median income for a household in the town was $26,875, and the median income for a family was $28,750. Males had a median income of $41,250 versus $17,813 for females. The per capita income for the town was $11,410. There were 22.6% of families and 26.6% of the population living below the poverty line, including 36.4% of under eighteens and 30.4% of those over 64.

Education
Escambia County Public School System is the local school district.

References 

Towns in Escambia County, Alabama
Towns in Alabama
Former county seats in Alabama